Johnny Leoni (born 30 June 1984) is a Swiss former professional footballer who played as a goalkeeper.

Career
Leoni joined FC Zürich in May 2003, but did not become their first-choice keeper until the 2005–06 season when he took over from Davide Taini.

He saved three penalty kicks in the penalty shootout in the quarterfinal of the Swiss Cup against FC Aarau.

His achievements were noticed by Ottmar Hitzfeld and he was included in four squads for the Swiss national team without making an appearance. Leoni earned his first cap for the Swiss on 10 August 2011 after coming on as a second-half substitute in a 2–1 win over Liechtenstein in a friendly match. He had previously been part of their 2010 FIFA World Cup squad but did not feature.

Leoni joined AC Omonia for the 2012–13 season after he agreed terms with the club in the January transfer window. He commented that, in order to join Omonia, he sacrificed a position in the national team of Switzerland. He played three matches in the league and two matches in the UEFA Europa League. He also won the Supercup of Cyprus.

In February 2013 Leoni joined Azerbaijan Premier League side Neftchi Baku on loan till the end of the season.

Club statistics

Honours
FC Zürich
Swiss Super League: 2006, 2007, 2009
Swiss Cup: 2005

AC Omonia
Cyprus FA Shield: 2012

Tochigi SC
 2017 promotion to J2

References

External links
 Official Website 
 
 
 
 

1984 births
Living people
People from Sion, Switzerland
Association football goalkeepers
Swiss men's footballers
Swiss expatriate footballers
Swiss Super League players
Cypriot First Division players
Primeira Liga players
J2 League players
J3 League players
FC Zürich players
AC Omonia players
FC Sion players
C.S. Marítimo players
AC Nagano Parceiro players
Tochigi SC players
Neftçi PFK players
Switzerland international footballers
2010 FIFA World Cup players
Expatriate footballers in Cyprus
Expatriate footballers in Azerbaijan
Expatriate footballers in Portugal
Expatriate footballers in Japan
Sportspeople from Valais
FC Le Mont players